The 2022 Copa América Femenina Group B was the second of two sets in the group stage of the 2022 Copa América Femenina that took place from  to . The group competition consisted of Argentina, Brazil, Peru, Uruguay, and Venezuela. The top two teams automatically qualified for the top four knockout stage, while third place moved on to a fifth place match against the third place finisher of Group A. In the knockout stage and fifth place match, the top three qualified to the 2023 FIFA Women's World Cup, fourth and fifth place continued to the 2023 FIFA Women's World Cup repêchage, and sixth place was eliminated.

Teams

Standings

Matches

Uruguay vs Venezuela

Brazil vs Argentina

Uruguay vs Brazil

Argentina vs Peru

Argentina vs Uruguay

Peru vs Venezuela

Venezuela vs Brazil

Peru vs Uruguay

Brazil vs Peru

Venezuela vs Argentina

Discipline
Fair play points will be used as tiebreakers in the group if the overall and head-to-head records of teams were tied. These are calculated based on yellow and red cards received in all group matches as follows:

 first yellow card: plus 1 point;
 indirect red card (second yellow card): plus 3 points;
 direct red card: plus 4 points;
 yellow card and direct red card: plus 5 points;

References

Group B